This is a summary of 1944 in music in the United Kingdom.

Events
4 January – Benjamin Britten and Peter Pears begin a long association with Decca Records, recording four of Britten's folk song arrangements. Britten spends most of this year at the Old Mill in Snape, Suffolk, working on the opera Peter Grimes.
 March – Vera Lynn goes to Shamsheernugger airfield in British India to entertain the troops before the Battle of Kohima.
 19 March – Michael Tippett's A Child of Our Time receives its first performances at London's Adelphi Theatre. 
25 May – Benjamin Britten and Peter Pears record Britten's Serenade for Tenor, Horn and Strings for Decca, with Dennis Brain and the Boyd Neel Orchestra.
28 July – Sir Henry Wood, aged 75, conducts his last Promenade Concert, evacuated to the Corn Exchange, Bedford.
23 September – English-born composer and violist Rebecca Clarke, stranded in the United States by the war, marries James Friskin, composer, concert pianist and founding member of the Juilliard School faculty.

Popular music
"One Love", music and words Jack Popplewell.

Classical music: new works
Arnold Bax – To Russia for baritone solo and chorus (Masefield) 
Gerald Finzi – Farewell to Arms
Ernest John Moeran – Sinfonietta (dedicated to Arthur Bliss)
Grace Williams – Sea Sketches
William Wordsworth – Symphony No. 1 in F minor

Film and Incidental music
William Alwyn – The Way Ahead
Jack Beaver, Roy Douglas & James Turner – Candlelight in Algeria
Allan Gray – A Canterbury Tale
Gordon Jacob – For Those in Peril
William Walton – Henry V, directed by and starring Laurence Olivier

Musical theatre
25 May – A Night In Venice (Johann Strauss II) London production opens at the Cambridge Theatre

Musical films
 Champagne Charlie starring Tommy Trinder
One Exciting Night directed by Walter Forde and starring Vera Lynn, Donald Stewart and Mary Clare.

Births
3 January – David Atherton, conductor
5 January – Jo Ann Kelly, singer and guitarist (John Dummer Band) (died 1990)
9 January – Jimmy Page, rock musician and producer (Led Zeppelin) 
19 January – Laurie London, English singer
27 January – Nick Mason, percussionist and composer (Pink Floyd)
28 January – John Tavener, composer (died 2013)
2 February – Andrew Davis, conductor
15 February – Mick Avory, drummer 
1 March – Roger Daltrey, vocalist (The Who)
17 March – John Lill, pianist
23 March – Michael Nyman, composer
6 April – Felicity Palmer, operatic mezzo-soprano
26 April – Richard Bradshaw, opera conductor (died 2007)
8 May 
Gary Glitter, singer-songwriter
Bill Legend,  drummer (T. Rex and Bill Legend's T. Rex)
10 May – Jackie Lomax, singer-songwriter and guitarist (The Undertakers) (died 2013)
12 May – Brian Kay, singer, conductor, and radio host (The King's Singers)
20 May – Joe Cocker, singer (died 2014)
17 June – Chris Spedding, singer-songwriter and guitarist 
21 June – Ray Davies, singer-songwriter (The Kinks)
22 June – Peter Asher, singer and record producer (Peter & Gordon)
24 June 
Jeff Beck, singer-songwriter and guitarist
John "Charlie" Whitney, English guitarist (Family, Axis Point, and Streetwalkers)
Chris Wood, English saxophonist (Traffic and Ginger Baker's Air Force) (d. 1983)
22 July – Rick Davies, keyboardist (Supertramp)
2 August – Jim Capaldi, musician and songwriter (died 2005)
5 August – Christopher Gunning, composer
16 August – Kevin Ayers, singer-songwriter (died 2013)
10 September – Thomas Allen, operatic baritone
9 October – John Entwistle, bassist (The Who) (died 2002)
2 November – Keith Emerson, keyboardist and composer (died 2016)
10 November – Tim Rice, lyricist

Deaths
19 January – Harold Fraser-Simson, songwriter and composer of light music (born 1872)
6 February – Philip Michael Faraday, organist, composer and theatrical producer (born 1875)
12 February – Annie Fortescue Harrison, songwriter and composer of piano music (born 1850 or 1851)
29 February – Durward Lely, operatic tenor (born 1852)
9 May – Dame Ethel Smyth, composer (born 1858)
24 June – Chick Henderson, dance band singer (born 1912; killed in action)
4 July – Alice Burville, singer and actress (born 1856)
11 July – Frank Bury, composer (born 1910; killed in action)
13 July – Eda Kersey, violinist (born 1904; stomach cancer)
19 August – Sir Henry Wood, conductor (born 1869)
21 September – Louis N. Parker, dramatist, composer and translator (born 1852)

See also
 1944 in British television
 1944 in the United Kingdom
 List of British films of 1944

References

 
British Music, 1944 In
British music by year
1940s in British music